Graham Capital Management (GCM) is an American hedge fund headquartered in Norwalk, Connecticut. The firm has a focus on global macro investing. It has additional offices in Florida and London.

Background 
GCM was founded in Stamford, Connecticut in July 1994 by Kenneth Tropin. Prior to this, Tropin was president and CEO of John W. Henry & Company, a commodities trading firm established by John W. Henry. In 1993, after Tropin parted ways with Henry, Paul Tudor Jones, a friend of Tropin encouraged him to start his own hedge fund and provided initial capital as a strategic investor.  When the firm was first established, it managed $29 million with $4 million from Tropin and $25 million from the Tudor Investment Corporation. Tudor would have a direct investment in GCM until 2003. GCM initial trading strategy focused on trend following.

In 1998, GCM started allowing discretionary investment management which enabled the firm to diversify its trading strategies. Around this time the firm also starting building its quantitative finance platform.

In May 2003, GCM acquired Rock Ledge for $17.3 million. In December 2003, refurbishments were completed and in 2004, the firm relocated its headquarters to Rock Ledge.

In 2004, GCM started accepting capital from external investors and launched its first multi-portfolio manager discretionary fund.

In the early 2000s, GCM had several occasions of poor performance. From February 2004 to April 2005, it had lost more than 30%.

In November 2007, GCM enhanced its risk management procedures and started holding daily risk management meetings which is still continued to this day.

GCM generated strong returns during the 2007–2008 financial crisis as the firm was able to recognize the impending insolvency of Bear Stearns which allowed the firm to move trades away from it. In 2008, all of GCM's funds had positive returns with most posting returns between ranging from 20 to 52 percent.

In 2014, GCM launched its Graham Quant Macro strategy to its institutional clients.

Despite the 2022 stock market decline causing many hedge funds to perform poorly that year, GCM outperformed its peers with double digit gains.

References

External links
 

Companies based in Norwalk, Connecticut
Financial services companies established in 1994
Hedge fund firms in Connecticut
Investment management companies of the United States
1994 establishments in Connecticut